Robert McGregor (1853 – 6 August 1931) was an English-born Australian politician.

He was born in Lambeth to blacksmith Charles McGregor and Isabel McPhee. He came to Victoria at a young age and was educated in Ballarat. He became a business agent and auctioneer, and married Mary Laurie, with whom he had nine children. In 1894 he was elected to the Victorian Legislative Assembly for Ballarat East. He was a minister without portfolio from 1900 to 1901, and from 1901 to 1902 was vice-president of the Board of Land and Works. He was Chairman of Committees from 1918 to 1921, but he lost his seat in 1924. McGregor died in Melbourne in 1931.

References

1853 births
1931 deaths
Nationalist Party of Australia members of the Parliament of Victoria
Members of the Victorian Legislative Assembly